Val Thomas might refer to:

Valerie Thomas (born 1943), American scientist and inventor
Valmore Thomas (born 1958), English footballer